Bischofshofen is a town in the district of St. Johann im Pongau in the Austrian federal state of Salzburg. It is an important traffic junction located both on the Salzburg-Tyrol Railway line and at the Tauern Autobahn, a major highway route crossing the main chain of the Alps.

Geography
It is surrounded by the Hochkönig massif in the west, part of the Berchtesgaden Alps, the Tennen Mountains in the northeast, and the Salzburg Slate Alps in the southeast.

The municipal area comprises the cadastral communities of Bischofshofen proper, Buchberg, Haidberg, and Winkl.

Villages in Bischofshofen and population
 Alpfahrt - 149
 Bischofshofen - 7.134
 Buchberg - 440
 Gainfeld - 109
 Haidberg - 98
 Kreuzberg - 263
 Laideregg - 488
 Mitterberghütten - 1.323
 Winkl - 83
 Asten - 50

History

In Neolithic times local Celtic tribes mined copper and salt in the nearby hills. Later, the Celts were conquered by or assimilated into the expanding Roman Empire, when the area was incorporated into the Noricum province. In the 3rd/4th century, a Roman road led from the Salzach valley to Radstadt on the Enns river.

In the 8th century, Bavarian tribes settled the region, promoted by the Agilolfing dukes and Bishop Rupert of Salzburg. The Pongau (pongowe) area was first mentioned in a 711 deed, when a monastery (Cella Maximiliana) was founded through the graces of the Salzburg archbishops and a noble family from Oberalm. Slavic tribes later destroyed this monastery. The village of Hoven itself first appeared in 1151. In the 12th century, the Archbishop of Salzburg gifted the present-day St. Maxmillian's church with the gold- and gem-encrusted relic St. Rubert's crucifix.

Located south of the Salzburg Werfen valley, Bischofshofen was vested with market rights in the 14th century and rose to become an administrative center and residence for the Bishops of Chiemsee. It declined through the turbulent 16th century with its natural disasters, economic decline and religious warfare, culminating in the German Peasants' War of 1525–26. More than two thirds of the local population were expelled during the Counter-Reformation measures instigated by Prince-archbishop Count Leopold Anton von Firmian from 1731 onwards. Many of the Salzburg Protestants found a new home in East Prussia.

Finally Bischofshofen re-emerged as a railway hub with the building of the Salzburg-Tyrol Railway line in the late 19th century. It was elevated to the status of a market town in 1900 and received town privileges on 24 September 2000.

Education
In Bischofshofen there are:

 Elementary Schools
 VS Markt
 VS Neue Heimat
 VS Pöham
 High Schools:
 Hermann-Wielandner-HS
 Franz-Moßhammer-HS
 Professional Education
 Polytechnische Schule
 Privatgymnasium Sankt Rupert
 TS Bischofshofen der Salzburger Tourismusschulen 
 die BAKIP, Bundesbildungsanstalt für Kindergartenpädagogik
 Zweigstelle des Musikum

Sports
The final competition of the traditional Four Hills Tournament in ski jumping is held annually at the Paul-Ausserleitner-Schanze in Bischofshofen around 6 January. The large hill ski jumping events at the FIS Nordic World Ski Championships 1999 took place in Bischofshofen.

Mayor
Hansjörg Obinger (SPÖ) is the mayor of Bischofshofen since April 2014. His predecessor was Jakob Rohrmoser (ÖVP).

Politics

City Council 
As of 2014 local elections, the political parties represented in the Bischofshofen City Council are:

 SPÖ (15 seats)
 ÖVP (8 seats)
 FPÖ (2 seats)

Twin towns — sister cities

Bischofshofen is twinned with:
 Unterhaching, Bavaria, Germany, since 1979
 Adeje, Santa Cruz de Tenerife, Canary Islands, Spain

Notable people
Hannes Schroll (1909–1985), Austrian Alpine ski racer and founder of the Sugar Bowl Ski Resort in Norden, California.
Paul Ausserleitner (1925–1952), ski jumper
Heinz Oberhummer (1941–2015), physicist 
Elisabeth Pall (born 1951), alpine skier
Patrick Reiter (born 1972), judoka.

References

External links

Municipal site 
Bischofshofen tourism board

Cities and towns in St. Johann im Pongau District